Lizardo Alzamora Porras (born December 30, 1928) was a Peruvian politician in the early 1970s. He was the mayor of Lima from 1973 to 1975.

References

 

1928 births
Living people
Mayors of Lima